KOBZAR Book Award is a biennial literary award that "recognizes outstanding contributions to Canadian literary arts by authors who develop a Ukrainian Canadian theme with literary merit". It is awarded in one of several genres: literary non-fiction, fiction, poetry, young readers' literature, plays, screenplays and musicals. The award was established in 2003 by the Shevchenko Foundation and the inaugural ceremony was held in 2006.

In 2020, the Shevchenko Foundation also launched a  Emerging Writers Short Prose Competition, setting the groundwork for new writers to explore the short prose form with unpublished entries, and to one day aspire to submit an entry to the main KOBZAR Book Award.

Winners
KOBZAR Book Award
2006: Danny Schur, Strike: The Musical (co-winner)
2006: Laura Langston, Lesia's Dream (co-winner)
2008: Janice Kulyk Keefer, The Ladies' Lending Library
2010: Randall Maggs, Night Work: The Sawchuk Poems
2012: Shandi Mitchell, Under This Unbroken Sky
2014: Diane Flacks, playwright, in collaboration with Andrey Tarasiuk and Luba Goy for the play Luba, Simply Luba
2016: Maurice Mierau, Detachment: An Adoption Memoir. 
2018: Lisa Grekul and Lindy Ledohowski (Editors), Unbound: Ukrainian Canadians Writing Home.
2020: Laisha Rosnau, Our Familiar Hunger

Shevchenko Foundation Emerging Writers Short Prose Competition
2020: Tanya Berezuk, "Grafting"
2021: Adrian Lysenko, "Carpathian Spruce"

See also

 List of literary awards
 List of poetry awards
 Shevchenko National Prize
 Vasyl Stus Prize
 Warrior of Light

References

External links
KOBZAR Book Award, official website
Shevchenko Foundation, official website

Ukrainian-Canadian culture
Canadian literary awards
Ukrainian literary awards
Awards established in 2003
2003 establishments in Canada